Kemang Village is an integrated development of residences with hotel, mall, hospital, school, country club, and spa, located at Mampang Prapatan, South Jakarta, Indonesia.

Lippo Mall Kemang
The main anchors of the mall are Debenhams Department Store, Hypermart, Cinema XXI, Best Denki, Fitness First Platinum and ACE Hardware. There is also a slew of major tenants such as Marks and Spencer, Timezone, iBox and Eatery Food Court. There are more than 200 fashion, entertainment, dining and lifestyle oriented tenants.

See also

Kemang, Jakarta
List of shopping malls in Jakarta
List of tallest buildings in Jakarta

References

Shopping malls in Jakarta
Residential skyscrapers in Indonesia
Buildings and structures in Jakarta
Post-independence architecture of Indonesia